Stempfferia carilla is a butterfly in the family Lycaenidae. It is found in Uganda.

References

Butterflies described in 1954
Poritiinae
Endemic fauna of Uganda
Butterflies of Africa